The People's Democratic Front (PDF) is a regional political party in the Indian state of Meghalaya. The PDF was founded in 2017 and was led by P. N. Syiem and Auspicious L. Mawphlang.

Currently, it is part of the North-East Democratic Alliance. The PDP's aim is to improve the development of the state especially of its tribal people living in it.

The two main tribes living in Meghalaya are the Khasi and the Garo: Khasi consist of sub-tribes including the Khynriam (mostly people from East and West Khasi Hills), Pnar from the Jaintia Hills, Bhoi from the Ri-Bhoi, and the War from the Southern part of the states, mostly along the borders.

In the 2018 Meghalaya Legislative Assembly election, the PDP won 128,413 votes (8.2% of the vote) and elected 4 MLAs.

References

2017 establishments in Meghalaya
Member parties of the National Democratic Alliance
Political parties established in 2017
Political parties in Meghalaya